Mirza Hossein-Qoli Khan Mafi (1832  6 August 1908) titled Nezam al-Saltaneh was an Iranian politician serving as the prime minister of Iran from 21 December 1907 to 21 May 1908.

He also served as the governor of Bushehr(1857), Yazd(1874), Dashtestan(1875), Zanjan(1885), Khuzestan and Bakhtiari areas along with Chaharmahal(1887 and again in 1894), Azerbaijan(1899) and Fars.

He died at the age of 86 and is buried in Imamzadeh Abdollah, Ray.

References 

19th-century Iranian politicians
20th-century Iranian politicians
1832 births
1908 deaths
Prime Ministers of Iran
People of the Persian Constitutional Revolution